There have been 21 managers in the history of the Los Angeles Angels Major League Baseball franchise. The Angels are based in Anaheim, California. They are members of the American League West division of the American League (AL) in Major League Baseball (MLB). The Angels franchise was formed in 1961 as a member of the American League. The team was formerly called the California Angels, the Anaheim Angels, and the Los Angeles Angels of Anaheim, before settling with the Los Angeles Angels.

Bill Rigney became the first manager of the then Los Angeles Angels in 1961, serving for just over eight seasons before being fired by Angels owner Gene Autry during the 1969 season. In terms of tenure, Mike Scioscia has managed more games and seasons than any other coach in franchise history. He managed the Angels to six playoff berths (2002, 2004, 2005, 2007, 2008, and 2009) led the team to a World Series championship in 2002, and won the Manager of the Year award in 2002 and 2009. With the Angels' 2009 Playoff appearance, Mike Scioscia became the first Major League Baseball manager "to guide his team to playoffs six times in [his] first 10 seasons." None of Scioscia's predecessors made it to the World Series. Dick Williams and Whitey Herzog, who served as an interim manager immediately before Williams, are the only Angels managers to have been inducted into the Baseball Hall of Fame.

There have been 16 interim managers in Angels history. In 1969, manager Bill Rigney was fired and replaced by Lefty Phillips. In 1974, manager Whitey Herzog replaced Bobby Winkles. After four games with Herzog at the helm, Dick Williams took over the managerial job and was then replaced with Norm Sherry. A year later, Sherry was replaced by Dave Garcia. Garcia didn't last a full season either, as Jim Fregosi took over as manager in 1978. In 1981, Fregosi was replaced in the mid-season by Gene Mauch. In 1988, manager Cookie Rojas was replaced eight games before the end of the season. After a start of 61 wins and 63 losses in 1991, manager Doug Rader was fired and was replaced by Buck Rodgers. A season later, Rodgers was replaced by Marcel Lachemann, who took the position for four games. He was then succeeded by John Wathan. Rodgers returned as manager in 1993, but he was soon replaced by Lachemann. In 1996, Lachemann was replaced by John McNamara, who in turn was replaced by Joe Maddon. In 1999, Terry Collins resigned as manager in mid-season. Joe Maddon finished the season. Mauch, Rodgers, Lachemann, McNamara, and Maddon have had two stints as manager.

On June 7th, 2022, the Angels announced via Twitter that manager Joe Maddon was relieved of his duties as manager. Maddon was signed to a 3 year deal with the team in October 2019 and replaced Brad Ausmus, who was fired after only one season with the team.   

Phil Nevin is the current interim manager of the Los Angeles Angels.

Key

Statistics are accurate through October 3rd,2021

Managers

Statistics as of June 12, 2022

Notes
 A running total of the number of managers of the Angels. Thus, any manager who has two or more separate terms is only counted once.

References

 
Los Angeles Angels
Managers